Nicole Gibbs and Asia Muhammad were the defending champions, but both players chose not to participate.

Madison Brengle and Sachia Vickery won the title, defeating Francesca Di Lorenzo and Katie Swan in the final, 6–3, 7–5.

Seeds

Draw

Draw

References
Main Draw

Berkeley Tennis Club Challenge - Doubles